Wang Weiguo (1949–1992), better known by his pen name Lu Yao, was a Chinese novelist.

Biography 
He was born on 3 December 1949 in Qingjian County, Shaanxi Province.  He had six siblings and grew up in a very poor family.

Career 
He began writing novels when he was a college student, and graduated from Chinese Department of Yan'an University in 1973. After graduation, he became an editor of Yanhe magazine. In 1982, Lu Yao published his novella "Life", which was made into a film in 1984. It was at this time that he started to become well known across China. In 1991, Lu Yao finished his most famous work, Ordinary World, which won the Mao Dun Literature Prize. His writing was closely related to his own life and experiences, and focused mostly on young people from his native Shaanbei striving to change their lives.

Death 
He died on 17 November 1992

References

1949 births
1992 deaths
Chinese male short story writers
People's Republic of China essayists
Writers from Yulin, Shaanxi
Short story writers from Shaanxi
20th-century novelists
Mao Dun Literature Prize laureates
Chinese male novelists
20th-century Chinese short story writers
20th-century essayists
20th-century Chinese male writers
People's Republic of China short story writers
People from Qingjian County